Winners are written first and are emboldened.

References

2012 film awards
2013 in Nigerian music
Culture in Lagos State
Entertainment events in Nigeria
Nigerian film awards
21st century in Lagos